The 1946–47 season was the forty-fifth season in which Dundee competed at a Scottish national level, and the second season playing in the second tier, as well as the first season back in the Scottish Football League following the end of World War II. Dundee would sport an impressively high-scoring team who would win the league and record several records, including logging 10–0 victories in consecutive games, with striker Albert Juliussen breaking records for most goals scored by a Dundee player in a single match (7) and most scored in two consecutive matches (13). Dundee would also compete in the Scottish Cup in its first edition since its suspension after the outbreak of war, and despite an impressive 1st round victory over Celtic, they would be knocked out in the Quarter-finals by Aberdeen.

Dundee would also compete in the inaugural staging of the Scottish League Cup, which had been inspired by the previous season's Southern League Cup. Just as in the Scottish Cup, they would be knocked out by Aberdeen in the Quarter-finals.

Scottish Division B 

Statistics provided by Dee Archive.

League table

Scottish League Cup 

Statistics provided by Dee Archive.

Group Section 6

Section 6 table

Knockout stage

Scottish Cup 

Statistics provided by Dee Archive.

Dundee received a bye past the 2nd round and directly into the 3rd round.

Player Statistics 
Statistics provided by Dee Archive

|}

See also 

 List of Dundee F.C. seasons

References

External links 

 1946-47 Dundee season on Fitbastats

Dundee F.C. seasons
Dundee